Dear… may refer to:

Dear... (Kyoko Fukada album)
Dear... (The Grace album)
Dear... (Sachi Tainaka album)
"Dear..." (song), a 2007 song by May J
Dear... (TV series), a 2020 television series on Apple TV+

See also 
 Dear (disambiguation)